The Selinda veld rat or Silinda rock rat (Aethomys silindensis) is a species of rodent in the family Muridae
found in possibly Mozambique and Zimbabwe.
Its natural habitat is subtropical or tropical dry forests.

References

Aethomys
Rodents of Africa
Mammals described in 1938
Taxonomy articles created by Polbot